Ee Adutha Kaalathu is a 2012 Indian Malayalam-language black comedy crime film written by Murali Gopy and directed by Arun Kumar Aravind. The film marks the second directorial venture by Arun Kumar Aravind, after his notable directorial debut Cocktail (2010). Kerala State Award winning cinematographer Shehnad Jalal handled the camera.

The narrative is patterned like a Rubik's Cube; it's a brainy entertainer that mixes various genres. It features the lives of six different persons from different strata of the social life of the city, interconnected due to unexpected events beyond their control. Bengali model and theater artiste Tanushree Ghosh makes her debut in Malayalam cinema with this film. The cast includes Indrajith, Murali Gopy, Anoop Menon, Nishan, Jagathy Sreekumar and Mythili. The music is composed by Gopi Sundar and the lyrics are by Rafeeq Ahmed.

The film was released on 24 February 2012 in Kerala to positive reviews. The film is considered a path-breaker for its bold and realistic narration and the innovative style of weaving story threads together. It was screened at the Malayalam Cinema Today category of the 17th International Film Festival of Kerala, where it won the NETPAC Award for Best Malayalam Film. Discussions are underway for the Hindi remake of the movie.

Premise 
Vishnu is an unemployed man who makes toys from garbages for the living. He has a wife named Ramani two daughters and mother. Ajay Kurien is a rich businessman who tries to ignore his wife Madhuri, who is a former actress.

Cast

Production

The film started the shooting on 12 September 2011 at Thiruvananthapuram. The official teaser was released on 5 September, even before the commencement of shooting. The teaser has been highly appreciated for its originality, the use of Malayalam words and for the background score.
The second schedule of shooting started on 28 October. Almost the whole movie was shot at Thiruvananthapuram except for few scenes which were shot at Nagercoil. The theatrical trailer was released on 27 January which became a hit in YouTube and social networking sites.

Music

The background score of the film has been composed by Gopi Sundar. The sound track was released by Manorama Music.

Reception
The film was released on 24 February in 63 centers inside Kerala. The film received positive reviews from the audiences and critics alike and has become a hit. It was mostly welcomed by the youth. The positive critical response from the viewers shows the thirst of viewers for varied films, rather than star, action oriented masala films.

Critical response
Malayala Manorama called the film "A must watch movie" and commented that "By the loud, standing ovation at the end, when the lights are on, Arun Kumar can rest assured that he has established himself as a director who has once again successfully brought about the phenomenal change Malayalam cinema has ever been thirsting for".

Indiaglitz.com rated the film (3.5/5) and said that "'Ee Adutha Kalathu' is one movie that is a definite prescription for a demanding viewer. A well-made film that works for its powerful plot and structuring, engaging script, and super performances." Metromatinee.com rated the movie as "Excellent" and said "'Ee Adutha Kalathu' is a remarkably refreshing and sensitive movie making a candid statement of life in the cities".

Veeyen of Nowrunning.com rated the film (3/5) and said, "Arun Kumar Aravind's 'Ee Adutha Kaalathu' is an emotionally bruising film that is oxymoronic to the core; it's the kind of film that is pleasingly depressing, casually engrossing and placidly terrorizing. A must-watch in short!"

Paresh C. Palicha of Rediff.com gave the movie a (3/5) rating and said that "Ee Adutha Kaalathu shows the life of six different people living a city, in a very entertaining manner".

Accolades
Mohan Raghavan Foundation Awards
 Best Script - Murali Gopy

Asiavision Movie Awards
 Outstanding Movie
 Best Editor – Arun Kumar Aravind
 New Sensation in Script – Murali Gopy
 Best Anti-hero – Murali Gopy
 Outstanding Performance – Indrajith
 New Promise in Singing – Anna Katharina

 International Film Festival of Kerala (2012)
 NETPAC Award for Best Malayalam Film

 Nana Film Awards
 Second Best Movie
 Best Script Writer - Murali Gopy
 Second Best Actor - Indrajith
 Second Best Actress - Lena

 P. Bhaskaran Foundation Awards
 Best Story - Murali Gopy

 Sathyan Award 
 The Best Actor - Indrajith Sukumaran

 Asianet Film Awards
 The Best Editor - Arun Kumar Aravind
 The Best Villain - Murali Gopy

 Vanitha Film Awards
 The Best Anti-Hero - Murali Gopy

South Indian International Movie Awards 
 Pending—Best Actress in a Supporting Role - Lena
 Pending—Best Actor in a Negative Role - Murali Gopy

References

External links
 

2012 films
2010s Malayalam-language films
Indian black comedy films
Films shot in Thiruvananthapuram
Films scored by Gopi Sundar
Hyperlink films
Indian nonlinear narrative films
Films set in Kerala
Films shot in Kerala
Films with screenplays by Murali Gopy
Malayalam films remade in other languages
Films directed by Arun Kumar Aravind
2012 black comedy films